In ethical philosophy, utilitarianism is a family of normative ethical theories that prescribe actions that maximize happiness and well-being for all affected individuals.

Although different varieties of utilitarianism admit different characterizations, the basic idea behind all of them is, in some sense, to maximize utility, which is often defined in terms of well-being or related concepts. For instance, Jeremy Bentham, the founder of utilitarianism, described utility as: That property in any object, whereby it tends to produce benefit, advantage, pleasure, good, or happiness ... [or] to prevent the happening of mischief, pain, evil, or unhappiness to the party whose interest is considered.

Utilitarianism is a version of consequentialism, which states that the consequences of any action are the only standard of right and wrong. Unlike other forms of consequentialism, such as egoism and altruism, utilitarianism considers the interests of humans equally. Proponents of utilitarianism have disagreed on a number of issues, such as whether actions should be chosen based on their likely results (act utilitarianism), or whether agents should conform to rules that maximize utility (rule utilitarianism). There is also disagreement as to whether total utility (total utilitarianism), average utility (average utilitarianism) or the utility of the people worst-off should be maximized.

Though the seeds of the theory can be found in the hedonists Aristippus and Epicurus, who viewed happiness as the only good, and in the work of the medieval Indian philosopher Śāntideva, the tradition of modern utilitarianism began with Jeremy Bentham, and continued with such philosophers as John Stuart Mill, Henry Sidgwick, R. M. Hare, and Peter Singer. The concept has been applied towards social welfare economics, questions of justice, the crisis of global poverty, the ethics of raising animals for food, and the importance of avoiding existential risks to humanity.

Etymology
Benthamism, the utilitarian philosophy founded by Jeremy Bentham, was substantially modified by his successor John Stuart Mill, who popularized the term utilitarianism. In 1861, Mill acknowledged in a footnote that, though Bentham believed "himself to be the first person who brought the word 'utilitarian' into use, he did not invent it. Rather, he adopted it from a passing expression" in John Galt's 1821 novel Annals of the Parish. However, Mill seems to have been unaware that Bentham had used the term utilitarian in his 1781 letter to George Wilson and his 1802 letter to Étienne Dumont.

Historical background

Pre-modern formulations 
The importance of happiness as an end for humans has long been recognized. Forms of hedonism were put forward by Aristippus and Epicurus; Aristotle argued that eudaimonia is the highest human good; and Augustine wrote that "all men agree in desiring the last end, which is happiness." Happiness was also explored in depth by Thomas Aquinas, in his Summa Theologica. Meanwhile, in medieval India, the 8th Century Indian philosopher Śāntideva was one of the earliest proponents of utilitarianism, writing that we ought "to stop all the present and future pain and suffering of all sentient beings, and to bring about all present and future pleasure and happiness."

Different varieties of consequentialism also existed in the ancient and medieval world, like the state consequentialism of Mohism or the political philosophy of Niccolò Machiavelli. Mohist consequentialism advocated communitarian moral goods, including political stability, population growth, and wealth, but did not support the utilitarian notion of maximizing individual happiness.

18th century 
Utilitarianism as a distinct ethical position only emerged in the 18th century, and although it is usually thought to have begun with Jeremy Bentham, there were earlier writers who presented theories that were strikingly similar.

Hutcheson 
Francis Hutcheson first introduced a key utilitarian phrase in An Inquiry into the Original of Our Ideas of Beauty and Virtue (1725): when choosing the most moral action, the amount of virtue in a particular action is proportionate to the number of people such brings happiness to. In the same way, moral evil, or vice, is proportionate to the number of people made to suffer. The best action is the one that procures the greatest happiness of the greatest numbers—and the worst is the one that causes the most misery. In the first three editions of the book, Hutcheson included various mathematical algorithms "to compute the Morality of any Actions." In doing so, he pre-figured the hedonic calculus of Bentham.

John Gay 
Some claim that John Gay developed the first systematic theory of utilitarian ethics. In Concerning the Fundamental Principle of Virtue or Morality (1731), Gay argues that:

This pursuit of happiness is given a theological basis:

Hume 
In An Enquiry Concerning the Principles of Morals (1751), David Hume writes:

Paley 

Gay's theological utilitarianism was developed and popularized by William Paley. It has been claimed that Paley was not a very original thinker and that the philosophies in his treatise on ethics is "an assemblage of ideas developed by others and is presented to be learned by students rather than debated by colleagues." Nevertheless, his book The Principles of Moral and Political Philosophy (1785) was a required text at Cambridge and Smith (1954) says that Paley's writings were "once as well known in American colleges as were the readers and spellers of William McGuffey and Noah Webster in the elementary schools." Schneewind (1977) writes that "utilitarianism first became widely known in England through the work of William Paley."

The now forgotten significance of Paley can be judged from the title of Thomas Rawson Birks's 1874 work Modern Utilitarianism or the Systems of Paley, Bentham and Mill Examined and Compared.

Apart from restating that happiness as an end is grounded in the nature of God, Paley also discusses the place of rules, writing:

Classical utilitarianism

Jeremy Bentham

Bentham's book An Introduction to the Principles of Morals and Legislation was printed in 1780 but not published until 1789. It is possible that Bentham was spurred on to publish after he saw the success of Paley's Principles of Moral and Political Philosophy. Though Bentham's book was not an immediate success, his ideas were spread further when Pierre Étienne Louis Dumont translated edited selections from a variety of Bentham's manuscripts into French. Traité de législation civile et pénale was published in 1802 and then later retranslated back into English by Hildreth as The Theory of Legislation, although by this time significant portions of Dumont's work had already been retranslated and incorporated into Sir John Bowring's edition of Bentham's works, which was issued in parts between 1838 and 1843.

Perhaps aware that Francis Hutcheson eventually removed his algorithms for calculating the greatest happiness because they "appear'd useless, and were disagreeable to some readers," Bentham contends that there is nothing novel or unwarranted about his method, for "in all this there is nothing but what the practice of mankind, wheresoever they have a clear view of their own interest, is perfectly conformable to."

Rosen (2003) warns that descriptions of utilitarianism can bear "little resemblance historically to utilitarians like Bentham and J. S. Mill" and can be more "a crude version of act utilitarianism conceived in the twentieth century as a straw man to be attacked and rejected." It is a mistake to think that Bentham is not concerned with rules. His seminal work is concerned with the principles of legislation and the hedonic calculus is introduced with the words "Pleasures then, and the avoidance of pains, are the ends that the legislator has in view." In Chapter VII, Bentham says: "The business of government is to promote the happiness of the society, by punishing and rewarding.... In proportion as an act tends to disturb that happiness, in proportion as the tendency of it is pernicious, will be the demand it creates for punishment."

Principle of utility 
Bentham's work opens with a statement of the principle of utility:

Hedonic calculus 
In Chapter IV, Bentham introduces a method of calculating the value of pleasures and pains, which has come to be known as the hedonic calculus. Bentham says that the value of a pleasure or pain, considered by itself, can be measured according to its intensity, duration, certainty/uncertainty and propinquity/remoteness. In addition, it is necessary to consider "the tendency of any act by which it is produced" and, therefore, to take account of the act's fecundity, or the chance it has of being followed by sensations of the same kind and its purity, or the chance it has of not being followed by sensations of the opposite kind. Finally, it is necessary to consider the extent, or the number of people affected by the action.

Evils of the first and second order 
The question then arises as to when, if at all, it might be legitimate to break the law. This is considered in The Theory of Legislation, where Bentham distinguishes between evils of the first and second order. Those of the first order are the more immediate consequences; those of the second are when the consequences spread through the community causing "alarm" and "danger".

It is true there are cases in which, if we confine ourselves to the effects of the first order, the good will have an incontestable preponderance over the evil. Were the offence considered only under this point of view, it would not be easy to assign any good reasons to justify the rigour of the laws. Every thing depends upon the evil of the second order; it is this which gives to such actions the character of crime, and which makes punishment necessary. Let us take, for example, the physical desire of satisfying hunger. Let a beggar, pressed by hunger, steal from a rich man's house a loaf, which perhaps saves him from starving, can it be possible to compare the good which the thief acquires for himself, with the evil which the rich man suffers?... It is not on account of the evil of the first order that it is necessary to erect these actions into offences, but on account of the evil of the second order.

John Stuart Mill

Mill was brought up as a Benthamite with the explicit intention that he would carry on the cause of utilitarianism. Mill's book Utilitarianism first appeared as a series of three articles published in Fraser's Magazine in 1861 and was reprinted as a single book in 1863.

Higher and lower pleasures
Mill rejects a purely quantitative measurement of utility and says:

The word utility is used to mean general well-being or happiness, and Mill's view is that utility is the consequence of a good action. Utility, within the context of utilitarianism, refers to people performing actions for social utility. With social utility, he means the well-being of many people. Mill's explanation of the concept of utility in his work, Utilitarianism, is that people really do desire happiness, and since each individual desires their own happiness, it must follow that all of us desire the happiness of everyone, contributing to a larger social utility. Thus, an action that results in the greatest pleasure for the utility of society is the best action, or as Jeremy Bentham, the founder of early Utilitarianism put it, as the greatest happiness of the greatest number.

Mill not only viewed actions as a core part of utility, but as the directive rule of moral human conduct. The rule being that we should only be committing actions that provide pleasure to society. This view of pleasure was hedonistic, as it pursued the thought that pleasure is the highest good in life. This concept was adopted by Bentham and can be seen in his works. According to Mill, good actions result in pleasure, and that there is no higher end than pleasure. Mill says that good actions lead to pleasure and define good character. Better put, the justification of character, and whether an action is good or not, is based on how the person contributes to the concept of social utility. In the long run the best proof of a good character is good actions; and resolutely refuse to consider any mental disposition as good, of which the predominant tendency is to produce bad conduct. In the last chapter of Utilitarianism, Mill concludes that justice, as a classifying factor of our actions (being just or unjust) is one of the certain moral requirements, and when the requirements are all regarded collectively, they are viewed as greater according to this scale of "social utility" as Mill puts it.

He also notes that, contrary to what its critics might say, there is "no known Epicurean theory of life which does not assign to the pleasures of the intellect ... a much higher value as pleasures than to those of mere sensation." However, he accepts that this is usually because the intellectual pleasures are thought to have circumstantial advantages, i.e. "greater permanency, safety, uncostliness, &c." Instead, Mill will argue that some pleasures are intrinsically better than others.

The accusation that hedonism is a "doctrine worthy only of swine" has a long history. In Nicomachean Ethics (Book 1 Chapter 5), Aristotle says that identifying the good with pleasure is to prefer a life suitable for beasts. The theological utilitarians had the option of grounding their pursuit of happiness in the will of God; the hedonistic utilitarians needed a different defence. Mill's approach is to argue that the pleasures of the intellect are intrinsically superior to physical pleasures.

Few human creatures would consent to be changed into any of the lower animals, for a promise of the fullest allowance of a beast's pleasures; no intelligent human being would consent to be a fool, no instructed person would be an ignoramus, no person of feeling and conscience would be selfish and base, even though they should be persuaded that the fool, the dunce, or the rascal is better satisfied with his lot than they are with theirs. ... A being of higher faculties requires more to make him happy, is capable probably of more acute suffering, and certainly accessible to it at more points, than one of an inferior type; but in spite of these liabilities, he can never really wish to sink into what he feels to be a lower grade of existence. ... It is better to be a human being dissatisfied than a pig satisfied; better to be Socrates dissatisfied than a fool satisfied. And if the fool, or the pig, are of a different opinion, it is because they only know their own side of the question...

Mill argues that if people who are "competently acquainted" with two pleasures show a decided preference for one even if it be accompanied by more discontent and "would not resign it for any quantity of the other," then it is legitimate to regard that pleasure as being superior in quality. Mill recognizes that these "competent judges" will not always agree, and states that, in cases of disagreement, the judgment of the majority is to be accepted as final. Mill also acknowledges that "many who are capable of the higher pleasures, occasionally, under the influence of temptation, postpone them to the lower. But this is quite compatible with a full appreciation of the intrinsic superiority of the higher." Mill says that this appeal to those who have experienced the relevant pleasures is no different from what must happen when assessing the quantity of pleasure, for there is no other way of measuring "the acutest of two pains, or the intensest of two pleasurable sensations." "It is indisputable that the being whose capacities of enjoyment are low, has the greatest chance of having them fully satisfied; and a highly-endowed being will always feel that any happiness which he can look for, as the world is constitute, is imperfect."

Mill also thinks that "intellectual pursuits have value out of proportion to the amount of contentment or pleasure (the mental state) that they produce." Mill also says that people should pursue these grand ideals, because if they choose to have gratification from petty pleasures, "some displeasure will eventually creep in. We will become bored and depressed." Mill claims that gratification from petty pleasures only gives short-term happiness and, subsequently, worsens the individual who may feel that his life lacks happiness, since the happiness is transient. Whereas, intellectual pursuits give long-term happiness because they provide the individual with constant opportunities throughout the years to improve his life, by benefiting from accruing knowledge. Mill views intellectual pursuits as "capable of incorporating the 'finer things' in life" while petty pursuits do not achieve this goal. Mill is saying that intellectual pursuits give the individual the opportunity to escape the constant depression cycle since these pursuits allow them to achieve their ideals, while petty pleasures do not offer this. Although debate persists about the nature of Mill's view of gratification, this suggests bifurcation in his position.

'Proving' the principle of utility 
In Chapter Four of Utilitarianism, Mill considers what proof can be given for the principle of utility:

It is usual to say that Mill is committing a number of fallacies:

 naturalistic fallacy: Mill is trying to deduce what people ought to do from what they in fact do; 
 equivocation fallacy: Mill moves from the fact that (1) something is desirable, i.e. is capable of being desired, to the claim that (2) it is desirable, i.e. that it ought to be desired; and 
 the fallacy of composition: the fact that people desire their own happiness does not imply that the aggregate of all persons will desire the general happiness.

Such allegations began to emerge in Mill's lifetime, shortly after the publication of Utilitarianism, and persisted for well over a century, though the tide has been turning in recent discussions. Nonetheless, a defence of Mill against all three charges, with a chapter devoted to each, can be found in Necip Fikri Alican's Mill's Principle of Utility: A Defense of John Stuart Mill's Notorious Proof (1994). This is the first, and remains the only, book-length treatment of the subject matter. Yet the alleged fallacies in the proof continue to attract scholarly attention in journal articles and book chapters.

Hall (1949) and Popkin (1950) defend Mill against this accusation pointing out that he begins Chapter Four by asserting that "questions of ultimate ends do not admit of proof, in the ordinary acceptation of the term" and that this is "common to all first principles". Therefore, according to Hall and Popkin, Mill does not attempt to "establish that what people do desire is desirable but merely attempts to make the principles acceptable." The type of "proof" Mill is offering "consists only of some considerations which, Mill thought, might induce an honest and reasonable man to accept utilitarianism."

Having claimed that people do, in fact, desire happiness, Mill now has to show that it is the only thing they desire. Mill anticipates the objection that people desire other things such as virtue. He argues that whilst people might start desiring virtue as a means to happiness, eventually, it becomes part of someone's happiness and is then desired as an end in itself.

Henry Sidgwick 

Sidgwick's book The Methods of Ethics has been referred to as the peak or culmination of classical utilitarianism. His main goal in this book is to ground utilitarianism in the principles of common-sense morality and thereby dispense with the doubts of his predecessors that these two are at odds with each other. For Sidgwick, ethics is about which actions are objectively right. Our knowledge of right and wrong arises from common-sense morality, which lacks a coherent principle at its core. The task of philosophy in general and ethics in particular is not so much to create new knowledge but to systematize existing knowledge. Sidgwick tries to achieve this by formulating methods of ethics, which he defines as rational procedures "for determining right conduct in any particular case". He identifies three methods: intuitionism, which involves various independently valid moral principles to determine what ought to be done, and two forms of hedonism, in which rightness only depends on the pleasure and pain following from the action. Hedonism is subdivided into egoistic hedonism, which only takes the agent's own well-being into account, and universal hedonism or utilitarianism, which is concerned with everyone's well-being.

Intuitionism holds that we have intuitive, i.e. non-inferential, knowledge of moral principles, which are self-evident to the knower. The criteria for this type of knowledge include that they are expressed in clear terms, that the different principles are mutually consistent with each other and that there is expert consensus on them. According to Sidgwick, commonsense moral principles fail to pass this test, but there are some more abstract principles that pass it, like that "what is right for me must be right for all persons in precisely similar circumstances" or that "one should be equally concerned with all temporal parts of one's life". The most general principles arrived at this way are all compatible with utilitarianism, which is why Sidgwick sees a harmony between intuitionism and utilitarianism. There are also less general intuitive principles, like the duty to keep one's promises or to be just, but these principles are not universal and there are cases where different duties stand in conflict with each other. Sidgwick suggests that we resolve such conflicts in a utilitarian fashion by considering the consequences of the conflicting actions.

The harmony between intuitionism and utilitarianism is a partial success in Sidgwick's overall project, but he sees full success impossible since egoism, which he considers as equally rational, cannot be reconciled with utilitarianism unless religious assumptions are introduced. Such assumptions, for example, the existence of a personal God who rewards and punishes the agent in the afterlife, could reconcile egoism and utilitarianism. But without them, we have to admit a "dualism of practical reason" that constitutes a "fundamental contradiction" in our moral consciousness.

Developments in the 20th century

Ideal utilitarianism
The description of ideal utilitarianism was first used by Hastings Rashdall in The Theory of Good and Evil (1907), but it is more often associated with G. E. Moore. In Ethics (1912), Moore rejects a purely hedonistic utilitarianism and argues that there is a range of values that might be maximized. Moore's strategy was to show that it is intuitively implausible that pleasure is the sole measure of what is good. He says that such an assumption:

Moore admits that it is impossible to prove the case either way, but he believed that it was intuitively obvious that even if the amount of pleasure stayed the same a world that contained such things as beauty and love would be a better world. He adds that, if a person was to take the contrary view, then "I think it is self-evident that he would be wrong."

Act and rule utilitarianism 

In the mid-20th century, a number of philosophers focused on the place of rules in utilitarian thought. It was already accepted that it is necessary to use rules to help you choose the right action because the problems of calculating the consequences on each and every occasion would almost certainly result in you frequently choosing something less than the best course of action. Paley had justified the use of rules and Mill says:

However, rule utilitarianism proposes a more central role for rules that was thought to rescue the theory from some of its more devastating criticisms, particularly problems to do with justice and promise keeping. Smart (1956) and McCloskey (1957) initially use the terms extreme and restricted utilitarianism but eventually settled on the prefixes act and rule instead. Likewise, throughout the 1950s and 1960s, articles were published both for and against the new form of utilitarianism, and through this debate the theory we now call rule utilitarianism was created. In an introduction to an anthology of these articles, the editor was able to say: "The development of this theory was a dialectical process of formulation, criticism, reply and reformulation; the record of this process well illustrates the co-operative development of a philosophical theory."

The essential difference is in what determines whether or not an action is the right action. Act utilitarianism maintains that an action is right if it maximizes utility; rule utilitarianism maintains that an action is right if it conforms to a rule that maximizes utility.

In 1956, Urmson (1953) published an influential article arguing that Mill justified rules on utilitarian principles. From then on, articles have debated this interpretation of Mill. In all probability, it was not a distinction that Mill was particularly trying to make and so the evidence in his writing is inevitably mixed. A collection of Mill's writing published in 1977 includes a letter that seems to tip the balance in favour of the notion that Mill is best classified as an act utilitarian. In the letter, Mill says:

Some school level textbooks and at least one British examination board make a further distinction between strong and weak rule utilitarianism. However, it is not clear that this distinction is made in the academic literature. It has been argued that rule utilitarianism collapses into act utilitarianism, because for any given rule, in the case where breaking the rule produces more utility, the rule can be refined by the addition of a sub-rule that handles cases like the exception. This process holds for all cases of exceptions, and so the "rules" have as many "sub-rules" as there are exceptional cases, which, in the end, makes an agent seek out whatever outcome produces the maximum utility.

Two-level utilitarianism 

In Principles (1973), R. M. Hare accepts that rule utilitarianism collapses into act utilitarianism but claims that this is a result of allowing the rules to be "as specific and un-general as we please." He argues that one of the main reasons for introducing rule utilitarianism was to do justice to the general rules that people need for moral education and character development and he proposes that "a difference between act-utilitarianism and rule-utilitarianism can be introduced by limiting the specificity of the rules, i.e., by increasing their generality." This distinction between a "specific rule utilitarianism" (which collapses into act utilitarianism) and "general rule utilitarianism" forms the basis of Hare's two-level utilitarianism.

When we are "playing God or the ideal observer", we use the specific form, and we will need to do this when we are deciding what general principles to teach and follow. When we are "inculcating" or in situations where the biases of our human nature are likely to prevent us doing the calculations properly, then we should use the more general rule utilitarianism.

Hare argues that in practice, most of the time, we should be following the general principles:

In Moral Thinking (1981), Hare illustrated the two extremes. The "archangel" is the hypothetical person who has perfect knowledge of the situation and no personal biases or weaknesses and always uses critical moral thinking to decide the right thing to do. In contrast, the "prole" is the hypothetical person who is completely incapable of critical thinking and uses nothing but intuitive moral thinking and, of necessity, has to follow the general moral rules they have been taught or learned through imitation. It is not that some people are archangels and others proles, but rather that "we all share the characteristics of both to limited and varying degrees and at different times."

Hare does not specify when we should think more like an "archangel" and more like a "prole" as this will, in any case, vary from person to person. However, the critical moral thinking underpins and informs the more intuitive moral thinking. It is responsible for formulating and, if necessary, reformulating the general moral rules. We also switch to critical thinking when trying to deal with unusual situations or in cases where the intuitive moral rules give conflicting advice.

Preference utilitarianism 

Preference utilitarianism entails promoting actions that fulfil the preferences of those beings involved. The concept of preference utilitarianism was first proposed in 1977 by John Harsanyi in Morality and the Theory of Rational Behaviour, however the concept is more commonly associated with R. M. Hare, Peter Singer, and Richard Brandt.

Harsanyi claims that his theory is indebted to:

 Adam Smith, who equated the moral point of view with that of an impartial but sympathetic observer;
 Immanuel Kant, who insisted on the criterion of universality, which may also be described as a criterion of reciprocity;
 the classical utilitarians who made maximizing social utility the basic criterion of morality; and 
 "the modern theory of rational behaviour under risk and uncertainty, usually described as Bayesian decision theory."

Harsanyi rejects hedonistic utilitarianism as being dependent on an outdated psychology saying that it is far from obvious that everything we do is motivated by a desire to maximize pleasure and minimize pain. He also rejects ideal utilitarianism because "it is certainly not true as an empirical observation that people's only purpose in life is to have 'mental states of intrinsic worth'."

According to Harsanyi, "preference utilitarianism is the only form of utilitarianism consistent with the important philosophical principle of preference autonomy. By this I mean the principle that, in deciding what is good and what is bad for a given individual, the ultimate criterion can only be his own wants and his own preferences."

Harsanyi adds two caveats. Firstly, people sometimes have irrational preferences. To deal with this, Harsanyi distinguishes between "manifest" preferences and "true" preferences. The former are those "manifested by his observed behaviour, including preferences possibly based on erroneous factual beliefs, or on careless logical analysis, or on strong emotions that at the moment greatly hinder rational choice"; whereas the latter are "the preferences he would have if he had all the relevant factual information, always reasoned with the greatest possible care, and were in a state of mind most conducive to rational choice." It is the latter that preference utilitarianism tries to satisfy.

The second caveat is that antisocial preferences, such as sadism, envy, and resentment, have to be excluded. Harsanyi achieves this by claiming that such preferences partially exclude those people from the moral community:

Negative utilitarianism

In The Open Society and its Enemies (1945), Karl Popper argues that the principle "maximize pleasure" should be replaced by "minimize pain". He believes that "it is not only impossible but very dangerous to attempt to maximize the pleasure or the happiness of the people, since such an attempt must lead to totalitarianism." He claims that:

The actual term negative utilitarianism itself was introduced by R. N. Smart as the title to his 1958 reply to Popper in which he argues that the principle would entail seeking the quickest and least painful method of killing the entirety of humanity.

In response to Smart's argument, Simon Knutsson (2019) has argued that classical utilitarianism and similar consequentialist views are roughly equally likely to entail killing the entirety of humanity, as they would seem to imply that one should kill existing beings and replace them with happier beings if possible. Consequently, Knutsson argues:

Furthermore, Knutsson notes that one could argue that other forms of consequentialism, such as classical utilitarianism, in some cases have less plausible implications than negative utilitarianism, such as in scenarios where classical utilitarianism implies it would be right to kill everyone and replace them in a manner that creates more suffering, but also more well-being such that the sum, on the classical utilitarian calculus, is net positive. Negative utilitarianism, in contrast, would not allow such killing.

Some versions of negative utilitarianism include:

 Negative total utilitarianism: tolerates suffering that can be compensated within the same person.
 Negative preference utilitarianism: avoids the problem of moral killing with reference to existing preferences that such killing would violate, while it still demands a justification for the creation of new lives. A possible justification is the reduction of the average level of preference-frustration.
 Pessimistic representatives of negative utilitarianism, which can be found in the environment of Buddhism.
Some see negative utilitarianism as a branch within modern hedonistic utilitarianism, which assigns a higher weight to the avoidance of suffering than to the promotion of happiness. The moral weight of suffering can be increased by using a "compassionate" utilitarian metric, so that the result is the same as in prioritarianism.

Motive utilitarianism

Motive utilitarianism was first proposed by Robert Merrihew Adams in 1976. Whereas act utilitarianism requires us to choose our actions by calculating which action will maximize utility and rule utilitarianism requires us to implement rules that will, on the whole, maximize utility, motive utilitarianism "has the utility calculus being used to select motives and dispositions according to their general felicific effects, and those motives and dispositions then dictate our choices of actions."

The arguments for moving to some form of motive utilitarianism at the personal level can be seen as mirroring the arguments for moving to some form of rule utilitarianism at the social level. Adams (1976) refers to Sidgwick's observation that "Happiness (general as well as individual) is likely to be better attained if the extent to which we set ourselves consciously to aim at it be carefully restricted." Trying to apply the utility calculation on each and every occasion is likely to lead to a sub-optimal outcome. Applying carefully selected rules at the social level and encouraging appropriate motives at the personal level is, so it is argued, likely to lead to a better overall outcome even if on some individual occasions it leads to the wrong action when assessed according to act utilitarian standards.

Adams concludes that "right action, by act-utilitarian standards, and right motivation, by motive-utilitarian standards, are incompatible in some cases." The necessity of this conclusion is rejected by Fred Feldman who argues that "the conflict in question results from an inadequate formulation of the utilitarian doctrines; motives play no essential role in it ... [and that] ... [p]recisely the same sort of conflict arises even when MU is left out of consideration and AU is applied by itself." Instead, Feldman proposes a variant of act utilitarianism that results in there being no conflict between it and motive utilitarianism.

Criticisms and Responses 
Because utilitarianism is not a single theory, but rather a cluster of related theories that have been developed over two hundred years, criticisms can be made for different reasons and have different targets.

Quantifying utility
A common objection to utilitarianism is the inability to quantify, compare, or measure happiness or well-being. Ray Briggs writes in the Stanford Encyclopedia of Philosophy:

Utility understood this way is a personal preference, in the absence of any objective measurement.

Utility ignores justice
As Rosen (2003) has pointed out, claiming that act utilitarians are not concerned about having rules is to set up a "straw man". Similarly, R.M. Hare refers to "the crude caricature of act utilitarianism which is the only version of it that many philosophers seem to be acquainted with." Given what Bentham says about second order evils, it would be a serious misrepresentation to say that he and similar act utilitarians would be prepared to punish an innocent person for the greater good. Nevertheless, whether they would agree or not, this is what critics of utilitarianism claim is entailed by the theory.

"Sheriff scenario" 

A classic version of this criticism was given by H. J. McCloskey in his 1957 "sheriff scenario":

By "extreme" utilitarian, McCloskey is referring to what later came to be called act utilitarianism. He suggests one response might be that the sheriff would not frame the innocent negro because of another rule: "do not punish an innocent person." Another response might be that the riots the sheriff is trying to avoid might have positive utility in the long run by drawing attention to questions of race and resources to help address tensions between the communities.

In a later article, McCloskey says:

The Brothers Karamazov 

An older form of this argument was presented by Fyodor Dostoyevsky in his book The Brothers Karamazov, in which Ivan challenges his brother Alyosha to answer his question: Tell me straight out, I call on you—answer me: imagine that you yourself are building the edifice of human destiny with the object of making people happy in the finale, of giving them peace and rest at last, but for that you must inevitably and unavoidably torture just one tiny creature, [one child], and raise your edifice on the foundation of her unrequited tears—would you agree to be the architect on such conditions? ... And can you admit the idea that the people for whom you are building would agree to accept their happiness on the unjustified blood of a tortured child, and having accepted it, to remain forever happy?

Predicting consequences 
Some argue that it is impossible to do the calculation that utilitarianism requires because consequences are inherently unknowable. Daniel Dennett describes this as the "Three Mile Island effect". Dennett points out that not only is it impossible to assign a precise utility value to the incident, it is impossible to know whether, ultimately, the near-meltdown that occurred was a good or bad thing. He suggests that it would have been a good thing if plant operators learned lessons that prevented future serious incidents.

Russell Hardin (1990) rejects such arguments. He argues that it is possible to distinguish the moral impulse of utilitarianism (which is "to define the right as good consequences and to motivate people to achieve these") from our ability to correctly apply rational principles that, among other things, "depend on the perceived facts of the case and on the particular moral actor's mental equipment." The fact that the latter is limited and can change does not mean that the former has to be rejected. "If we develop a better system for determining relevant causal relations so that we are able to choose actions that better produce our intended ends, it does not follow that we then must change our ethics. The moral impulse of utilitarianism is constant, but our decisions under it are contingent on our knowledge and scientific understanding."

From the beginning, utilitarianism has recognized that certainty in such matters is unobtainable and both Bentham and Mill said that it was necessary to rely on the tendencies of actions to bring about consequences. G. E. Moore, writing in 1903, said:

Demandingness objection
Act utilitarianism not only requires everyone to do what they can to maximize utility, but to do so without any favouritism. Mill said, "As between his own happiness and that of others, utilitarianism requires him to be as strictly impartial as a disinterested and benevolent spectator." Critics say that this combination of requirements leads to utilitarianism making unreasonable demands. The well-being of strangers counts just as much as that of friends, family or self. "What makes this requirement so demanding is the gargantuan number of strangers in great need of help and the indefinitely many opportunities to make sacrifices to help them." As Shelly Kagan says, "Given the parameters of the actual world, there is no question that ... (maximally) ... promoting the good would require a life of hardship, self-denial, and austerity ... a life spent promoting the good would be a severe one indeed."

Hooker (2002) describes two aspects to the problem: act utilitarianism requires huge sacrifices from those who are relatively better off and also requires sacrifice of your own good even when the aggregate good will be only slightly increased. Another way of highlighting the complaint is to say that in utilitarianism, "there is no such thing as morally permissible self-sacrifice that goes above and beyond the call of duty." Mill was quite clear about this, "A sacrifice which does not increase, or tend to increase, the sum total of happiness, it considers as wasted."

One response to the problem is to accept its demands. This is the view taken by Peter Singer, who says:No doubt we do instinctively prefer to help those who are close to us. Few could stand by and watch a child drown; many can ignore the avoidable deaths of children in Africa or India. The question, however, is not what we usually do, but what we ought to do, and it is difficult to see any sound moral justification for the view that distance, or community membership, makes a crucial difference to our obligations.Others argue that a moral theory that is so contrary to our deeply held moral convictions must either be rejected or modified. There have been various attempts to modify utilitarianism to escape its seemingly over-demanding requirements. One approach is to drop the demand that utility be maximized. In Satisficing Consequentialism, Michael Slote argues for a form of utilitarianism where "an act might qualify as morally right through having good enough consequences, even though better consequences could have been produced." One advantage of such a system is that it would be able to accommodate the notion of supererogatory actions.

Samuel Scheffler takes a different approach and amends the requirement that everyone be treated the same. In particular, Scheffler suggests that there is an "agent-centered prerogative" such that when the overall utility is being calculated it is permitted to count our own interests more heavily than the interests of others. Kagan suggests that such a procedure might be justified on the grounds that "a general requirement to promote the good would lack the motivational underpinning necessary for genuine moral requirements" and, secondly, that personal independence is necessary for the existence of commitments and close personal relations and that "the value of such commitments yields a positive reason for preserving within moral theory at least some moral independence for the personal point of view."

Robert Goodin takes yet another approach and argues that the demandingness objection can be "blunted" by treating utilitarianism as a guide to public policy rather than one of individual morality. He suggests that many of the problems arise under the traditional formulation because the conscientious utilitarian ends up having to make up for the failings of others and so contributing more than their fair share.

Gandjour specifically considers market situations and analyses whether individuals who act in markets may produce a utilitarian optimum. He lists several demanding conditions that need to be satisfied: individuals need to display instrumental rationality, markets need to be perfectly competitive, and income and goods need to be redistributed.

Harsanyi argues that the objection overlooks the fact that "people attach considerable utility to freedom from unduly burdensome moral obligations ... most people will prefer a society with a more relaxed moral code, and will feel that such a society will achieve a higher level of average utility—even if adoption of such a moral code should lead to some losses in economic and cultural accomplishments (so long as these losses remain within tolerable limits). This means that utilitarianism, if correctly interpreted, will yield a moral code with a standard of acceptable conduct very much below the level of highest moral perfection, leaving plenty of scope for supererogatory actions exceeding this minimum standard."

Aggregating utility 
The objection that "utilitarianism does not take seriously the distinction between persons" came to prominence in 1971 with the publication of John Rawls' A Theory of Justice. The concept is also important in animal rights advocate Richard Ryder's rejection of utilitarianism, in which he talks of the "boundary of the individual", through which neither pain nor pleasure may pass.

However, a similar objection was noted in 1970 by Thomas Nagel, who claimed that consequentialism "treats the desires, needs, satisfactions, and dissatisfactions of distinct persons as if they were the desires, etc., of a mass person;" and even earlier by David Gauthier, who wrote that utilitarianism supposes that "mankind is a super-person, whose greatest satisfaction is the objective of moral action. ... But this is absurd. Individuals have wants, not mankind; individuals seek satisfaction, not mankind. A person's satisfaction is not part of any greater satisfaction." Thus, the aggregation of utility becomes futile as both pain and happiness are intrinsic to and inseparable from the consciousness in which they are felt, rendering impossible the task of adding up the various pleasures of multiple individuals.

A response to this criticism is to point out that whilst seeming to resolve some problems it introduces others. Intuitively, there are many cases where people do want to take the numbers involved into account. As Alastair Norcross has said:[S]uppose that Homer is faced with the painful choice between saving Barney from a burning building or saving both Moe and Apu from the building ... it is clearly better for Homer to save the larger number, precisely because it is a larger number. ... Can anyone who really considers the matter seriously honestly claim to believe that it is worse that one person die than that the entire sentient population of the universe be severely mutilated? Clearly not.It may be possible to uphold the distinction between persons whilst still aggregating utility, if it accepted that people can be influenced by empathy. This position is advocated by Iain King, who has suggested the evolutionary basis of empathy means humans can take into account the interests of other individuals, but only on a one-to-one basis, "since we can only imagine ourselves in the mind of one other person at a time." King uses this insight to adapt utilitarianism, and it may help reconcile Bentham's philosophy with deontology and virtue ethics.

Philosopher John Taurek also argued that the idea of adding happiness or pleasures across persons is quite unintelligible and that the numbers of persons involved in a situation are morally irrelevant. Taurek's basic concern comes down to this: we cannot explain what it means to say that things would be five times worse if five people die than if one person dies. "I cannot give a satisfactory account of the meaning of judgments of this kind," he wrote (p. 304). He argues that each person can only lose one person's happiness or pleasures. There is not five times more loss of happiness or pleasure when five die: who would be feeling this happiness or pleasure? "Each person's potential loss has the same significance to me, only as a loss to that person alone. because, by hypothesis, I have an equal concern for each person involved, I am moved to give each of them an equal chance to be spared his loss" (p. 307). Derek Parfit (1978) and others have criticized Taurek's line, and it continues to be discussed.

Calculating utility is self-defeating
An early criticism, which was addressed by Mill, is that if time is taken to calculate the best course of action it is likely that the opportunity to take the best course of action will already have passed. Mill responded that there had been ample time to calculate the likely effects:

More recently, Hardin has made the same point. "It should embarrass philosophers that they have ever taken this objection seriously. Parallel considerations in other realms are dismissed with eminently good sense. Lord Devlin notes, 'if the reasonable man "worked to rule" by perusing to the point of comprehension every form he was handed, the commercial and administrative life of the country would creep to a standstill.

It is such considerations that lead even act utilitarians to rely on "rules of thumb", as Smart (1973) has called them.

Special obligations criticism

One of the oldest criticisms of utilitarianism is that it ignores our special obligations. For example, if we were given the choice between saving two random people or our mother, most would choose to save their mothers. According to utilitarianism, such a natural action is immoral. The first to respond to this was an early utilitarian and friend of Jeremy Bentham named William Godwin, who held in his work Enquiry Concerning Political Justice that such personal needs should be disregarded in favour of the greatest good for the greatest number of people. Applying the utilitarian principle "that life ought to be preferred which will be most conducive to the general good" to the choice of saving one of two people, either "the illustrious Archbishop of Cambray" or his chambermaid, he wrote: Supposing the chambermaid had been my wife, my mother or my benefactor. That would not alter the truth of the proposition. The life of [the Archbishop] would still be more valuable than that of the chambermaid; and justice, pure, unadulterated justice, would still have preferred that which was most valuable.

Criticisms of utilitarian value theory

Utilitarianism's assertion that well-being is the only thing with intrinsic moral value has been attacked by various critics. Thomas Carlyle derided "Benthamee Utility, virtue by Profit and Loss; reducing this God's-world to a dead brute Steam-engine, the infinite celestial Soul of Man to a kind of Hay-balance for weighing hay and thistles on, pleasures and pains on". Karl Marx, in Das Kapital, criticises Bentham's utilitarianism on the grounds that it does not appear to recognise that people have different joys in different socioeconomic contexts:

With the driest naivete he takes the modern shopkeeper, especially the English shopkeeper, as the normal man. Whatever is useful to this queer normal man, and to his world, is absolutely useful. This yard-measure, then, he applies to past, present, and future. The Christian religion, e.g., is "useful," "because it forbids in the name of religion the same faults that the penal code condemns in the name of the law." Artistic criticism is "harmful," because it disturbs worthy people in their enjoyment of Martin Tupper, etc. With such rubbish has the brave fellow, with his motto, "nulla dies sine linea [no day without a line]", piled up mountains of books.

Pope John Paul II, following his personalist philosophy, argued that a danger of utilitarianism is that it tends to make persons, just as much as things, the object of use. "Utilitarianism", he wrote, "is a civilization of production and of use, a civilization of things and not of persons, a civilization in which persons are used in the same way as things are used."

Duty-based criticisms
W. D. Ross, speaking form the perspective of his deontological pluralism, acknowledges that there is a duty to promote the maximum of aggregate good, as utilitarianism demands. But, Ross contends, this is just one besides various other duties, like the duty to keep one's promises or to make amends for wrongful acts, which are ignored by the simplistic and reductive utilitarian outlook.

Roger Scruton was a deontologist, and believed that utilitarianism did not give duty the place that it needed inside our ethical judgements. He asked us to consider the dilemma of Anna Karenina, who had to choose between her love of Vronsky and her duty towards her husband and her son. Scruton wrote, "Suppose Anna were to reason that it is better to satisfy two healthy young people and frustrate one old one than to satisfy one old person and frustrate two young ones, by a factor of 2.5 to 1: ergo I am leaving. What would we think, then, of her moral seriousness?"

Baby farming

In Innocence and Consequentialism (1996), Jacqueline Laing, a critic of utilitarianism, argues that utilitarianism has insufficient conceptual apparatus to comprehend the very idea of innocence, a feature central to any comprehensive ethical theory. In particular, Peter Singer on her view, cannot without contradicting himself reject baby farming (a thought experiment that involves mass-producing deliberately brain-damaged children for live birth for the greater good of organ harvesting) and at the same time hold on to his "personism" a term coined by Jenny Teichman to describe his fluctuating (and Laing says, irrational and discriminatory) theory of human moral value. His explanation that baby farming undermines attitudes of care and concern for the very young, can be applied to babies and the unborn (both 'non-persons' who may be killed, on his view) and contradicts positions that he adopts elsewhere in his work.

Additional considerations

Average versus total happiness

In The Methods of Ethics, Henry Sidgwick asked, "Is it total or average happiness that we seek to make a maximum?" Paley notes that, although he speaks of the happiness of communities, "the happiness of a people is made up of the happiness of single persons; and the quantity of happiness can only be augmented by increasing the number of the percipients, or the pleasure of their perceptions" and that if extreme cases, such as people held as slaves, are excluded the amount of happiness will usually be in proportion to the number of people. Consequently, "the decay of population is the greatest evil that a state can suffer; and the improvement of it the object which ought, in all countries, to be aimed at in preference to every other political purpose whatsoever." A similar view was expressed by Smart, who argued that, all other things being equal, a universe with two million happy people is better than a universe with only one million happy people.

Since Sidgwick raised the question it has been studied in detail and philosophers have argued that using either total or average happiness can lead to objectionable results.

According to Derek Parfit, using total happiness falls victim to the repugnant conclusion, whereby large numbers of people with very low but non-negative utility values can be seen as a better goal than a population of a less extreme size living in comfort. In other words, according to the theory, it is a moral good to breed more people on the world for as long as total happiness rises.

On the other hand, measuring the utility of a population based on the average utility of that population avoids Parfit's repugnant conclusion but causes other problems. For example, bringing a moderately happy person into a very happy world would be seen as an immoral act; aside from this, the theory implies that it would be a moral good to eliminate all people whose happiness is below average, as this would raise the average happiness.

William Shaw suggests that the problem can be avoided if a distinction is made between potential people, who need not concern us, and actual future people, who should concern us. He says, "utilitarianism values the happiness of people, not the production of units of happiness. Accordingly, one has no positive obligation to have children. However, if you have decided to have a child, then you have an obligation to give birth to the happiest child you can."

Motives, intentions, and actions
Utilitarianism is typically taken to assess the rightness or wrongness of an action by considering just the consequences of that action. Bentham very carefully distinguishes motive from intention and says that motives are not in themselves good or bad but can be referred to as such on account of their tendency to produce pleasure or pain. He adds that, "from every kind of motive, may proceed actions that are good, others that are bad, and others that are indifferent." Mill makes a similar point and explicitly says that "motive has nothing to do with the morality of the action, though much with the worth of the agent. He who saves a fellow creature from drowning does what is morally right, whether his motive be duty, or the hope of being paid for his trouble."

However, with intention the situation is more complex. In a footnote printed in the second edition of Utilitarianism, Mill says: "the morality of the action depends entirely upon the intention—that is, upon what the agent wills to do." Elsewhere, he says, "Intention, and motive, are two very different things. But it is the intention, that is, the foresight of consequences, which constitutes the moral rightness or wrongness of the act."

The correct interpretation of Mill's footnote is a matter of some debate. The difficulty in interpretation centres around trying to explain why, since it is consequences that matter, intentions should play a role in the assessment of the morality of an action but motives should not. One possibility "involves supposing that the 'morality' of the act is one thing, probably to do with the praiseworthiness or blameworthiness of the agent, and its rightness or wrongness another." Jonathan Dancy rejects this interpretation on the grounds that Mill is explicitly making intention relevant to an assessment of the act not to an assessment of the agent.

An interpretation given by Roger Crisp draws on a definition given by Mill in A System of Logic, where he says that an "intention to produce the effect, is one thing; the effect produced in consequence of the intention, is another thing; the two together constitute the action." Accordingly, whilst two actions may outwardly appear to be the same they will be different actions if there is a different intention. Dancy notes that this does not explain why intentions count but motives do not.

A third interpretation is that an action might be considered a complex action consisting of several stages and it is the intention that determines which of these stages are to be considered part of the action. Although this is the interpretation favoured by Dancy, he recognizes that this might not have been Mill's own view, for Mill "would not even allow that 'p & q' expresses a complex proposition. He wrote in his System of Logic I iv. 3, of 'Caesar is dead and Brutus is alive', that 'we might as well call a street a complex house, as these two propositions a complex proposition'."

Finally, whilst motives may not play a role in determining the morality of an action, this does not preclude utilitarians from fostering particular motives if doing so will increase overall happiness.

Other sentient beings 

In An Introduction to the Principles of Morals and Legislation, Bentham wrote "the question is not, Can they reason? nor, Can they talk? but, Can they suffer?" Mill's distinction between higher and lower pleasures might suggest that he gave more status to humans. However, in his essay "Whewell on Moral Philosophy", Mill defends Bentham's position, calling it a 'noble anticipation', and writing: "Granted that any practice causes more pain to animals than it gives pleasure to man; is that practice moral or immoral? And if, exactly in proportion as human beings raise their heads out of the slough of selfishness, they do not with one voice answer 'immoral', let the morality of the principle of utility be for ever condemned."

Henry Sidgwick also considers the implications of utilitarianism for nonhuman animals. He writes: "We have next to consider who the 'all' are, whose happiness is to be taken into account. Are we to extend our concern to all the beings capable of pleasure and pain whose feelings are affected by our conduct? or are we to confine our view to human happiness? The former view is the one adopted by Bentham and Mill, and (I believe) by the Utilitarian school generally: and is obviously most in accordance with the universality that is characteristic of their principle ... it seems arbitrary and unreasonable to exclude from the end, as so conceived, any pleasure of any sentient being."

Among contemporary utilitarian philosophers, Peter Singer is especially known for arguing that the well-being of all sentient beings ought to be given equal consideration. Singer suggests that rights are conferred according to the level of a creature's self-awareness, regardless of their species. He adds that humans tend to be speciesist (discriminatory against non-humans) in ethical matters, and argues that, in utilitarianism, speciesism cannot be justified as there is no rational distinction that can be made between the suffering of humans and the suffering of nonhuman animals; all suffering ought to be reduced. Singer writes: "The racist violates the principle of equality by giving greater weight to the interests of members of his own race, when there is a clash between their interests and the interests of those of another race. Similarly the speciesist allows the interests of his own species to override the greater interests of members of other species. The pattern is the same in each case ... Most human beings are speciesists."

In his 1990 edition of Animal Liberation, Peter Singer said that he no longer ate oysters and mussels, because although the creatures might not suffer, there was a possibility they may and it was easy to avoid eating them in any case.

This view still might be contrasted with deep ecology, which holds that an intrinsic value is attached to all forms of life and nature, whether currently assumed to be sentient or not. According to utilitarianism, the forms of life that are unable to experience anything akin to either enjoyment or discomfort are denied moral status, because it is impossible to increase the happiness or reduce the suffering of something that cannot feel happiness or suffer. Singer writes:
The capacity for suffering and enjoying things is a prerequisite for having interests at all, a condition that must be satisfied before we can speak of interests in any meaningful way. It would be nonsense to say that it was not in the interests of a stone to be kicked along the road by a schoolboy. A stone does not have interests because it cannot suffer. Nothing that we can do to it could possibly make any difference to its welfare. A mouse, on the other hand, does have an interest in not being tormented, because it will suffer if it is. If a being suffers, there can be no moral justification for refusing to take that suffering into consideration. No matter what the nature of the being, the principle of equality requires that its suffering be counted equally with the like suffering—in so far as rough comparisons can be made—of any other being. If a being is not capable of suffering, or of experiencing enjoyment or happiness, there is nothing to be taken into account.

Thus, the moral value of one-celled organisms, as well as some multi-cellular organisms, and natural entities like a river, is only in the benefit they provide to sentient beings. Similarly, utilitarianism places no direct intrinsic value on biodiversity, although the benefits that biodiversity brings to sentient beings may mean that, in utilitarianism, biodiversity ought to be maintained in general.

In John Stuart Mill's essay "On Nature" he argues that the welfare of wild animals is to be considered when making utilitarian judgments. Tyler Cowen argues that, if individual animals are carriers of utility, then we should consider limiting the predatory activity of carnivores relative to their victims: "At the very least, we should limit current subsidies to nature's carnivores."

Application to specific issues 
The concept has been applied towards social welfare economics, the crisis of global poverty, the ethics of raising animals for food, and the importance of avoiding existential risks to humanity. In the context of lying, some utilitarians support white lies.

World poverty 
An article in the American Economic Journal has addressed the issue of Utilitarian ethics within redistribution of wealth. The journal stated that taxation of the wealthy is the best way to make use of the disposable income they receive. This says that the money creates utility for the most people by funding government services. Many utilitarian philosophers, including Peter Singer and Toby Ord, argue that inhabitants of developed countries in particular have an obligation to help to end extreme poverty across the world, for example by regularly donating some of their income to charity. Peter Singer, for example, argues that donating some of one's income to charity could help to save a life or cure somebody from a poverty-related illness, which is a much better use of the money as it brings someone in extreme poverty far more happiness than it would bring to oneself if one lived in relative comfort. However, Singer not only argues that one ought to donate a significant proportion of one's income to charity, but also that this money should be directed to the most cost-effective charities, in order to bring about the greatest good for the greatest number, consistent with utilitarian thinking. Singer's ideas have formed the basis of the modern effective altruism movement.

See also 

 Altruism (ethical doctrine)
 Applied ethics
 Anti-Utilitarianism
 Appeal to consequences
 Bounded rationality
 Charity International
 Classical liberalism
 Cost–benefit analysis
 Decision analysis
 Decision theory
 Effective altruism
 Gross national happiness
 Happiness pump
 List of utilitarians
 Pleasure principle (psychology)
 Prioritarianism
 Probabilistic reasoning
 Radicalism (historical)
 Relative utilitarianism
 State consequentialism
 Collectivism and individualism
 Uncertainty
 Utility monster
 Utilitarian bioethics
 Utilitarian cake-cutting

References

Citations

Bibliography
 Adams, Robert Merrihew. 1976. "Motive Utilitarianism." Journal of Philosophy 73(14):467–81. . .
 Alican, Necip Fikri. 1994. Mill's Principle of Utility: A Defense of John Stuart Mill's Notorious Proof. Amsterdam: Editions Rodopi B.V. .
 Anscombe, G. E. M. 1958. "Modern Moral Philosophy." Philosophy 33(124):1–19. . .
 Ashcraft, Richard. 1991. John Locke: Critical Assessments. Routledge.
 Bayles, M. D. 1968. Contemporary Utilitarianism. Doubleday: Anchor Books.
 Bentham, Jeremy. [1789] 2009. An Introduction to the Principles of Morals and Legislation (Dover Philosophical Classics). Dover Publications Inc. .
 Bentham, Jeremy, and Etienne Dumont. [1807] 2005. Theory of Legislation: Translated from the French of Etienne Dumont, translated by R. Hildreth. Adamant Media Corporation. .
 Bowring, John. [1838–1843] 2001. The Works of Jeremy Bentham 1. Adamant Media Corporation. .
 Brandt, Richard B. 1979. A Theory of the Good and the Right. Clarendon Press. .
 Bredeson, Dean. 2011. "Utilitarianism vs. Deontological Ethics." In Applied Business Ethics: A Skills-Based Approach. Cengage Learning. .
 Broome, John. 1991. Weighing Goods. Oxford: Basil Blackwell.
 Dancy, Jonathan. 2000. "Mill's Puzzling Footnote." Utilitas 12(2):219. .
 Dennett, Daniel. 1995. Darwin's Dangerous Idea. Simon & Schuster. . Internet Archive ID: darwinsdangerous0000denn.
 Feldman, Fred. 1993. "On the Consistency of Act- and Motive-Utilitarianism: A Reply to Robert Adams." Philosophical Studies 70(2):201–12. .
 Gauthier, David. 1963. Practical Reasoning: The Structure and Foundations of Prudential and Moral Arguments and Their Exemplification in Discourse. Oxford University Press. .
 Gay, John. 2002. "Concerning the Fundamental Principle of Virtue or Morality." In Moral Philosophy from Montaigne to Kant, edited by J. B. Schneewind. Cambridge University Press. .
 Goodin, Robert E. 1995. Utilitarianism as a Public Philosophy. Cambridge University Press. .
 Goodstein, Eban. 2011. "Ethics and Economics." Ch. 2 in Economics and the Environment. Wiley. .
 Habib, Allen. [2008] 2014. "Promises." Stanford Encyclopedia of Philosophy.
 Halévy, Élie. 1966. The Growth of Philosophic Radicalism. Beacon Press. .
 Hall, Everett W. 1949. "The 'Proof' of Utility in Bentham and Mill." Ethics 60(1):1–18. . .
 Hardin, Russell. 1990. Morality within the Limits of Reason. University of Chicago Press. .
 Hare, R. M. 1972–1973. "The Presidential Address: Principles." Proceedings of the Aristotelian Society, New Series, 73:1–18. . .
 —— 1981. Moral thinking: its levels, method, and point. Oxford: Clarendon Press. .
 Harsanyi, John C. 1977. "Morality and the theory of rational behavior." Social Research 44 (4):623–56. .
 Reprinted: 1982. "Morality and the theory of rational behaviour." Pp. 39–62 in Utilitarianism and Beyond, edited by A. Sen and B. Williams. Cambridge: Cambridge University Press. .
 —— 1975. "Can the Maximin Principle Serve as a Basis for Morality? A Critique of John Rawls's Theory of Justice." American Political Science Review 69(2):594–606. . . .
 Hooker, Brad. 2002. Ideal Code, Real World: A Rule-Consequentialist Theory of Morality. Clarendon Press. .
 —— 2011. "The Demandingness Objection." Ch. 8 in The problem of moral demandingness: new philosophical essays, edited by T. Chappell. Palgrave Macmillan. .
 Hume, David. [1751] 2002. "An Enquiry Concerning the Principles of Morals." In Moral Philosophy from Montaigne to Kant, edited by J. B. Schneewind. Cambridge University Press. .
 Hutcheson, Francis. [1725] 2002. "The Original of Our Ideas of Beauty and Virtue." In Moral Philosophy from Montaigne to Kant, edited by J. B. Schneewind. Cambridge University Press. .
 Kagan, Shelly. 1991. The Limits of Morality (Oxford Ethics Series). Clarendon Press. .
 —— 1984. "Does Consequentialism Demand too Much? Recent Work on the Limits of Obligation." Philosophy & Public Affairs 13(3):239–54. .
 Lyons, David. 1965. Forms and Limits of Utilitarianism. Oxford: Oxford University Press. .
 McCloskey, H. J. 1957. "An Examination of Restricted Utilitarianism." Philosophical Review 66(4):466–85. . 
 —— 1963. "A Note on Utilitarian Punishment." Mind 72(288):599. . .

Further reading
 Broome, John. 1998. "Modern Utilitarianism". Pp. 651–56 in The New Palgrave Dictionary of Economics and the Law 2, edited by P. Newman. London: Macmillan.
 Cornman, James, et al. 1992. Philosophical Problems and Arguments – An Introduction (4th ed.). Indianapolis, IN: Hackett Publishing Co.
 Glover, Jonathan. 1977. Causing Death and Saving Lives. Penguin Books. . 
 Hansas, John. 2008. "Utilitarianism." Pp. 518–19 in The Encyclopedia of Libertarianism, edited by R. Hamowy. Thousand Oaks, CA: SAGE / Cato Institute. . . . .
 Harwood, Sterling. 2009. "Eleven Objections to Utilitarianism." Ch. 11 in Moral Philosophy: A Reader (4th ed.), edited by L. P. Pojman and P. Tramel. Indianapolis, IN: Hackett. . .
 Mackie, J. L. 1991. "Utilitarianism." Ch. 6 in Ethics: Inventing Right and Wrong. Penguin Books. .
 Martin, Michael. 1970. "A Utilitarian Kantian Principle." Philosophical Studies 21:90–91.
 Rachels, James, and Stuart Rachels. 2012. "The Utilitarian Approach" and "The Debate of Utilitarianism." Ch. 7 & 8 in The Elements of Moral Philosophy. McGraw-Hill Higher Education. .
 
 Silverstein, Harry S. 1972. "A Defence of Cornman's Utilitarian Kantian Principle." Philosophical Studies 23:212–15.
 
 Singer, Peter. 1981. The Expanding Circle: Ethics and Sociobiology. New York: Farrar, Straus & Giroux. 
 —— 1993. "Consequentialism" and "The Utility and the Good." Ch. 19 & 20 in A Companion to Ethics (Blackwell Companions to Philosophy). Wiley-Blackwell. .
 Stokes, Eric. 1959. The English Utilitarians and India. Clarendon Press. 
 Sumner, L. Wayne. Abortion: A Third Way. Princeton, NJ: Princeton University Press.
 

 
 Williams, Bernard. 1993. "Utilitarianism." Ch. 10 in Morality: An Introduction to Ethics. Cambridge University Press. .

External links

Introduction to Utilitarianism An introductory online textbook on utilitarianism coauthored by William MacAskill.

Utilitarian.org FAQ A FAQ by Nigel Phillips on utilitarianism by a web site affiliated to David Pearce.
A Utilitiarian FAQ, by Ian Montgomerie.
The English Utilitarians, Volume l by Sir Leslie Stephen
The English Utilitarians, Volume 2 by Sir Leslie Stephen
Utilitarian Philosophers Large compendium of writings by and about the major utilitarian philosophers, both classic and contemporary.
Utilitarianism A summary of classical utilitarianism, and modern alternatives, with application to ethical issues and criticisms.
Utilitarian Resources Collection of definitions, articles and links.
Primer on the Elements and Forms of Utilitarianism A convenient summary of the major points of utilitarianism.
Utilitarianism as Secondary Ethic A concise review of Utilitarianism, its proponents and critics.
A summary of some little-known objections to utilitarianism

 
Classical liberalism
Consequentialism
Normative ethics
Hedonism
Social philosophy
Jeremy Bentham
Happiness